Melsoft Games (formerly Melesta Games) is a Lithuanian video game developer focusing on casual mobile games. The company was founded in Belarus in 2008, and later opened offices in Cyprus and Lithuania. It was acquired by Israeli mobile video game developer Moon Active in December 2020.

History 
Melsoft was founded in Minsk in 2008 as Melesta Games, and it released its first game, Farm Frenzy, the same year. In 2012, it switched its focus to mobile gaming. It signed a partnership with UK game developer Wargaming in 2016. Melesta Games changes its name to Melsoft Games.

Melsoft was acquired by Israeli mobile video game developer Moon Active in December 2020.

List of Games

 Dream Farm
 Family Island
 Farm Frenzy (PC, iOS, Android, DS)
 Farm Frenzy: Refreshed
 Farm Frenzy 2
 Green City
 Green City 2
 Island Realms
 Jo's Dream: Organic Coffee
 Monster Mutiny
 My Cafe
 Rolling Idols
 Rolling Idols: Lost City
 Space Roadkill
 Spooky Mall
 Snow Globe: Farm World
 Toy Defense (PC, iOS, Android, 3DS)
 Toy Defense 2
 Toy Defense 3: Fantasy
 Toy Monsters
 Virtual Farm
 Virtual Farm 2
 Zuba

References

External links
 

Macintosh software companies
Video game development companies
Privately held companies
Video game companies established in 2008
Video game companies of Lithuania
2008 establishments in Lithuania